Wendy Burge (born October 1, 1957) is an American former competitive figure skater. Born in Alaska, she won the silver medal at the 1975 U.S. Figure Skating Championships and placed 6th at the 1976 Winter Olympics. She retired in Orange County, California after working as a professional coach for over twenty years.

Results

References

American female single skaters
Olympic figure skaters of the United States
Figure skaters at the 1976 Winter Olympics
Living people
1957 births
Sportspeople from Alaska
Sportspeople from Orange County, California
21st-century American women